This is a list of lineae on Europa. Most Europan lineae are named after characters and places in the legends of Cadmus and Europa; others are named after important megalithic stone rows built by the Neolithic peoples of Britain and France.

See also the list of craters on Europa and list of geological features on Europa.

External links
 USGS: Europa nomenclature

Lineae on Europa
Europa